The Wolseley Town Hall and Opera House (today called the Wolseley Community Centre) is a provincial designated historic building in the town of Wolseley, Saskatchewan, Canada.  The property is a two-storey, brick and fieldstone building of Italian Baroque design, constructed between 1906 and 1907.  The building was intended to be multi-purpose serving as a town office, fire hall, library, community hall as well as performances from visiting tour groups.  The building serves the town as a community hall.

References 

Government buildings completed in 1907
Theatres in Saskatchewan